Malženice is a village and municipality of Trnava District in the Trnava region of Slovakia.

References

External links
https://www.webcitation.org/5QjNYnAux?url=http://www.statistics.sk/mosmis/eng/run.html
http://en.e-obce.sk/obec/malzenice/malzenice.html

Villages and municipalities in Trnava District